Sarıqışlaq is a village in the Zangilan District of Azerbaijan.

References 

Populated places in Zangilan District